The Grenoble Challenger is a tennis tournament held in Grenoble, France since 1999. The event is part of the ''challenger series and is played on indoor hard courts.

Past finals

Singles

Doubles

Tennis tournaments in France
Indoor tennis tournaments
Hard court tennis tournaments
ATP Challenger Tour
Sport in Grenoble